Scott A. Friedholm (born March 14, 1975) is an American college baseball coach and former catcher. Friedholm is the head coach of the UNC Asheville Bulldogs baseball team.

Amateur career
Friedholm attended Walpole High School in Walpole, Massachusetts. Friedholm played for the school's varsity baseball team. Friedholm then enrolled at Providence College, to play college baseball for the Providence Friars baseball team.

As a freshman at Providence College in 1995, Friedholm was a member of the Friars team that won a school record 44 games and winning the Big East Conference. In 1996, he played collegiate summer baseball for the Chatham A's of the Cape Cod Baseball League, where he was a league all-star and helped lead the team to the league title.

As a sophomore in 1997, Friedholm had a .381 batting average, a .471 on-base percentage (OBP) and a .636 SLG.

In the 1998 season as a junior, Friedholm batted .352 with a .525 SLG, 3 home run, and 30 RBIs. He was named First Team All-Big East.

During his senior season, he hit 13 home runs, 21 doubles, 3 triples and 66 RBIs. He was named First Team All-Big East.

Professional career
Friedholm began his professional career with the St. Petersburg Devil Rays of the Class A-Advanced Florida State League, where he batted .200 with one RBI.

Coaching career
Friedholm began his coaching career in 1999 as a pitching coach for the Bryant Bulldogs baseball program. In 2002, Friedholm left Bryant to join the coaching staff of the Maine Black Bears to served under Paul Kostacopoulos, whom recruited Friedholm at Providence. On August 30, 2005, he followed Kostacopoulos to work for the Navy Midshipmen baseball program. On July 28, 2010, he joined Mike Gambino's coaching staff at Boston College.

On June 18, 2014, Friedholm was the head coach of the UNC Asheville Bulldogs baseball program. Friedholm led the Bulldogs to a 21–34 record in his first season. In 2017, he led the Bulldogs to the first berth in the Big South Conference baseball tournament since 2012.

Head coaching record

See also
 List of current NCAA Division I baseball coaches

References

External links

UNC Asheville Bulldogs bio

Living people
1975 births
Baseball catchers
Providence Friars baseball players
Chatham Anglers players
St. Petersburg Devil Rays players
Bryant Bulldogs baseball coaches
Maine Black Bears baseball coaches
Navy Midshipmen baseball coaches
Boston College Eagles baseball coaches
UNC Asheville Bulldogs baseball coaches
Baseball players from Massachusetts
Baseball coaches from Massachusetts